The CS 42/2 is an Italian wooden cased anti-tank mine used during the Second World War. The mine uses four PMC 43 buttons, which can be substituted for Model 42/2 fuzes to make it function as an Anti-personnel mine.

Specifications
 Dimensions: 340 x 289 x 160 millimeters
 Operating pressure: 220 lbs
 Explosive content: 11 lbs of TNT

References
 Landmine and Countermine Warfare, Italy 1943-1944

Anti-tank mines of Italy